This is a list of songs about Montreal, the second-most populous city in Canada and most populous city in the Canadian province of Quebec.

Background
According to the Montreal Gazette, "songwriters and poets have been hallucinating over Montreal for ages. It's a city where small-towners from the regions dream of making their mark, a city of love where nights on the Main can give you frissons and being alone makes no sense, a city dwarfed by the otherworldly cross atop Mount Royal." In songs, the city frequently has been compared to Paris and viewed as the "Paris of North America".

In 2012, to celebrate its 20th year, the Pointe-à-Callière Museum, which aims to promote the history of Montreal, published a ranking of the five songs about Montreal that most outstandingly discuss it. The ranking was based on votes from thousands of online users.

List
This list includes only songs for which at least one reliable source says that the song is about Montreal.

Notes

References

Montreal
Montreal-related lists
Music of Montreal
Songs about Canada
Works about Montreal